Mangelia androyensis is a species of sea snail, a marine gastropod mollusk in the family Mangeliidae.

Description
The length of the shell attains 7.5 mm.

Distribution
This species occurs in the Indian Ocean off Madagascar.

References

 Bozzetti, L., 2009. Genere Mangelia Risso, 1826 (Gastropoda: Hypsogastropoda: Conidae, Mangeliinae). Due nuove specie dal Madagascar meridionale. Malacologia Mostra Mondiale 63: 10–12
 Bozzetti, L., 2009. Mangelia androyensis: a new name for Mangelia vitrea Bozzetti, 2009, non Mangelia vitrea Risso, 1826. Malacologia Mostra Mondiale 65: 7

External links
 
 MNHN, Paris : Mangelia androyensis (holotype)

androyensis
Gastropods described in 2009